The 1860 United States presidential election in North Carolina took place on November 6, 1860, as part of the 1860 United States presidential election. North Carolina voters chose 10 representatives, or electors, to the Electoral College, who voted for president and vice president.

North Carolina was won by the 14th Vice President of the United States John C. Breckinridge (SD–Kentucky), running with Senator Joseph Lane, with 50.51 percent of the popular vote, against Senator John Bell (CU–Tennessee), running with the 15th Governor of Massachusetts Edward Everett, with 46.66 percent of the popular vote.

Republican Party candidate Abraham Lincoln was not on the ballot in the state. Nonetheless, as of the 2020 presidential election this is the last election in which Yadkin County did not vote for the Republican presidential nominee.

Results

Notes

References

North Carolina
1860
1860 North Carolina elections